Al-Sindiyana (Es Sindiyâna) was a Palestinian Arab village in the Haifa Subdistrict. It was depopulated during the 1947–1948 Civil War in Mandatory Palestine on May 12, 1948. It was located 29 km south of Haifa.

History

Ottoman era
On 16 March 1799, during the  Ottoman era,   Napoleon had a battle here just north of the village.

In 1859, the population was estimated to be 300, who cultivated 22 feddans of land.

Victor Guérin visited the village in 1863. Transcribing its name as Sendianeh, he notes there are 400 inhabitants and that its name must derive from the Arabic word sendian, meaning "evergreen oak", as these abound on the hills flanking the village.

In 1882, the  PEF's Survey of Western Palestine described Sindianeh as a "village of moderate size on high ground, with a spring below it, and a cave; it was here that the tunnel of the Cæsarea aqueduct is said to have broken into by women digging for clay".

A population list from about 1887 showed that Al-Sindiyana had about 520 inhabitants; all Muslims.

British Mandate era
In the 1922 census of Palestine, conducted by the  British Mandate authorities,  Al Sendianeh had a population of 576; all Muslims,  increasing in the 1931 census to 923; 922 Muslim and 1 Jew, in a total of  217 houses.

Al-Sindiyana had an elementary school for boys, which by  1942-1943 had 200 students. The village had several wells and springs.

In  the 1945 statistics it had a population of 1,250 Muslims,  with a total of 15,172 dunams of land. Of this, a total of 8,177 dunums of land was allocated to cereals; 225 dunums were irrigated or used for orchards,  while 24 dunams were built-up (urban) land.

Post 1948
In 1992 the village site was described: "The site is fenced in with barbed wire. Scattered piles of stones, the debris of destroyed houses, are visible among thorns, cactuses and fig, olive, and palm trees. The surrounding lands are used by Israelis as a grazing area."

References

Bibliography

External links
Welcome To al-Sindiyana
al-Sindiyana,  Zochrot
Survey of Western Palestine, Map 8:  IAA, Wikimedia commons
al-Sindiyana, at Khalil Sakakini Cultural Center

Arab villages depopulated during the 1948 Arab–Israeli War
District of Haifa